Leo Augustine Furlong Jr. (October 15, 1930 – June 13, 2009) was a politician in the American state of Florida. He served in the Florida House of Representatives from 1963 to 1965, representing Dade County.

References

1930 births
2009 deaths
Democratic Party members of the Florida House of Representatives
Politicians from Charleston, South Carolina
University of Miami alumni
20th-century American politicians